Caenides dacela, commonly known as the common recluse, is a species of butterfly in the family Hesperiidae. It is found within the geographical range that stretches from the Basse Casamance in Senegal to Uganda and Kenya, but generally does not penetrate much south of the Equator (mainly to Gabon and upper Kasai). Amongst the genus Caenides, Caenides dacela is the most common and most widely distributed.  The habitat consists of forests.

The larvae feed on Raphia and Phoenix species (including Phoenix dactylifera).

References

Butterflies described in 1876
Hesperiinae
Butterflies of Africa
Taxa named by William Chapman Hewitson